Sorkheh Lizheh Karim Ali (also Romanized as Sorkheh Līzheh Karim ʿAlī; also known as Deh Karim ʿAlī) is a village in Zirtang Rural District, Kunani District, Kuhdasht County, Lorestan Province, Iran. At the 2006 census, its population was 418, in 77 families.

References 

Towns and villages in Kuhdasht County